Lady Helen is the main restaurant in the Mount Juliet Golf & Spa Hotel in Thomastown, County Kilkenny Ireland. It is a fine dining restaurant that has been awarded one Michelin star.

The executive chef of Lady Helen is John Kelly. The restaurant is named after Lady Helen McCalmont of the McCalmont family, the last private owners of the Mount Juliet house.

Awards
 Michelin star: since 2014
 3 Rosettes: 2014–2019

See also
List of Michelin starred restaurants in Ireland

References

Michelin Guide starred restaurants in Ireland